Yuriy Martyshchuk (born 22 April 1986 in Kolomyia) is a professional Ukrainian football goalkeeper who played for Chornomorets Odesa in the Ukrainian Premier League. He joined Zorya from Karpaty prior to the 2010–11 season after 5 seasons having only minimal playing time.

See also
 2005 FIFA World Youth Championship squads#Ukraine

External links

 
 

1986 births
Living people
People from Kolomyia
FC Karpaty Lviv players
FC Zorya Luhansk players
FC Spartak Ivano-Frankivsk players
FC Chornomorets Odesa players
Ukrainian Premier League players
Ukrainian footballers
Ukraine youth international footballers
Ukraine under-21 international footballers
Association football goalkeepers
Sportspeople from Ivano-Frankivsk Oblast